William Herbert Henry (25 November 1904 – 19 August 1974) was an Australian rules footballer who played with Collingwood, Hawthorn and Essendon in the Victorian Football League (VFL).

Early life
The son of James Henry (1864–1948) and Annie Henry, nee Poole (1873–1908), William Herbert Henry was born at Ballarat East on 25 November 1904.

Football
A forward, Bill Henry joined Collingwood from Camberwell/Surrey Hills in 1925 but struggled to make the team, making only two senior appearances. 

Henry subsequently transferred to Hawthorn for two seasons, making a further eight appearances, before transferring to Essendon for the 1928 VFL season.

In 1929 Henry played for Yarraville in the Victorian Football Association and then in 1930 transferred to Oakleigh where he finished his senior playing career.

Henry later served as secretary of the Oakleigh Football Club for many years.

Death
Bill Henry died in Oakleigh, Victoria at the age of 69 and was cremated at Springvale Botanical Cemetery.

Notes

External links 

Bill Henry's playing statistics from The VFA Project
Bill Henry's profile at Collingwood Forever
Bill Henry's profile at Essendon FC website

1904 births
1974 deaths
Australian rules footballers from Ballarat
Collingwood Football Club players
Hawthorn Football Club players
Essendon Football Club players
Yarraville Football Club players
Oakleigh Football Club players
Burials in Victoria (Australia)